The 1987–88 Toronto Maple Leafs season saw the Maple Leafs finish in fourth place in the Norris Division with a record of 21 wins, 49 losses, and 10 ties for 52 points. Despite posting the second-worst record in the league, they qualified for the Stanley Cup playoffs on the last day of the season in part due to playing in an extremely weak Norris Division; the division champion Detroit Red Wings were the only team in the division with a winning record. Their .325 winning percentage is the third-worst in franchise history, and one of the lowest ever for a playoff qualifier (Across all major North American sports leagues). For an NHL team, their .325 percentage is the worst mark to qualify for the playoffs for a team that played at least 70 games. They lost to the Red Wings in six games in the Division Semi-finals.

Off-season

Regular season
The Maple Leafs finished last in power-play goals scored (54), power-play opportunities (347) and power-play percentage (15.56%).

Final standings

Schedule and results

Playoffs

The Toronto Maple Leafs were defeated 4 games to 2 against the Norris Division winning Detroit Red Wings.

Player statistics

Regular season
Scoring

Goaltending

Playoffs
Scoring

Goaltending

Awards and records

Transactions
The Maple Leafs have been involved in the following transactions during the 1987-88 season.

Trades

Waivers

Free agents

Draft picks
Toronto's draft picks at the 1987 NHL Entry Draft held at the Joe Louis Arena in Detroit, Michigan. The Maple Leafs attempted to select Grant Paranica in the second round of the 1987 NHL Supplemental Draft, but the claim was ruled invalid since Paranica entered school after age 20 and therefore did not meet eligibility requirements.

Farm teams

See also
 1987–88 NHL season

References

External links

Toronto Maple Leafs season, 1987-88
Toronto
Toronto Maple Leafs seasons